Henry Quartey (born 12 March 1971) is a Ghanaian politician and member of the Seventh Parliament of the Fourth Republic of Ghana representing the Ayawaso Central Constituency in the Greater Accra Region on the ticket of the New Patriotic Party. He is currently the Minister for Greater Accra Region.

Early life and education 
Quartey was born on 12 March 1971. He hails from Otublohum-Accra, a town in the Greater Accra Region of Ghana. He had his secondary educations at the Hams Secondary School in Dansoman and Zams Secondary/Technical School in Bolgatanga. He had his G.C.E. O'level at Osu Presbyterian Senior High School. He entered Ghana Institute of Management and Public Administration and obtained his postgraduate certificate in Public Administration.

Politics 
Quartey is a member of the New Patriotic Party (NPP). In 2012, he contested for the Ayawaso Central seat on the ticket of the NPP sixth parliament of the fourth republic and won. He was a member of the Roads and Transport Committee as well as Gender and Children Committee.

Committees 
Quartey is a member of Roads and Transport Committee and also a member of the Appointments Committee.

Career 
He was the CEO of Krafty Hospitality Services Limited in Accra from 2003 to date. He was also the Sales and Marketing Manager of B.B.C Trading from 1992 to 1996. He later became the Regional Director of Dalebrook Company Limited from 1997 to 1998. He was also the Sales Manager and Director of Pecoll Aluminiuim Systems from 1995 to 2000. He was the Deputy Minister for Interior.  He was the Deputy Minister for National Security. He is currently the Greater Accra Regional Minister.

Personal life 
Quartey is a Christian. He is married to Sybil Ansah Quartey with six children.

Philanthropy 
In September 2021, Henry pledged to support Psalm Adjeteyfio with a monthly stipend of GH¢1,500. Henry claimed he was inspired by Psalm's impact in the film and entertainment industry in Ghana hence the pledge.

References 

Ghanaian MPs 2017–2021
1971 births
Living people
New Patriotic Party politicians
Ghana Institute of Management and Public Administration alumni
People from Greater Accra Region
Ghanaian MPs 2021–2025